Daddy's Girls is an American television sitcom created by Brenda Hampton and David Landsberg, that aired on CBS from September 21 to October 12, 1994.

Overview
The series followed Dudley Walker (Dudley Moore), the owner of a New York fashion house who loses his wife and his business partner when, after a years-long secret affair, they run off together leaving him as the primary caretaker to his three daughters.

The series is notable as the first in which a gay principal character was played by an openly gay actor. Harvey Fierstein played Dennis Sinclair, a high-strung designer at Walker's firm.

The series was critically panned, and was placed "on hiatus" after only three episodes had aired.

This was Moore's penultimate on-screen job and his last regular television series. He later attributed his difficulties during the production of the show to the early stages of progressive supranuclear palsy, the disease that ultimately led to his death in 2002.

Cast
 Dudley Moore as Dudley Walker
 Harvey Fierstein as Dennis Sinclair
 Stacy Galina as Amy Walker
 Meredith Scott Lynn as Samantha Walker
 Keri Russell as Phoebe Walker
 Phil Buckman as Scar
 Alan Ruck as Lenny

Episodes

Reception
Although Fierstein earned praise for his performance, Daddy's Girls was hated by critics. New York magazine called the series "Despised, reviled." Entertainment Weekly, somewhat prophetically, found Moore to be "wan and confused". The Dallas Morning News could only say that "Daddy's Girls isn't horrendously bad" but somewhat prophetically predicted that it would not last until Christmas.

References

External links
 Daddy's Girls at the Internet Movie Database

American LGBT-related sitcoms
1990s American LGBT-related comedy television series
1990s American sitcoms
1994 American television series debuts
1994 American television series endings
CBS original programming
Television series by Warner Bros. Television Studios
Television shows set in Los Angeles